Spyridon Sotiropoulos was a Hellenic Army general.

He was born in Patras in 1859, and enlisted in the infantry as a volunteer on 21 March 1879 (O.S.). He served in the Greco-Turkish War of 1897 and the Balkan Wars of 1912–13, advancing through the ranks. As a monarchist, he was dismissed from the Army in 1917–1920 during the National Schism. He was reinstated with the electoral victory of the monarchist opposition in November 1920, before retiring on 6 October 1921 (O.S.) with the rank of Major General.

References

1859 births
20th-century deaths
20th-century Greek people
Hellenic Army major generals
Greek military personnel of the Balkan Wars
Greek military personnel of the Greco-Turkish War (1897)
Military personnel from Patras